Coastal artillery is the branch of the armed forces concerned with operating anti-ship artillery or fixed gun batteries in coastal fortifications.

From the Middle Ages until World War II, coastal artillery and naval artillery in the form of cannons were highly important to military affairs and generally represented the areas of highest technology and capital cost among materiel. The advent of 20th-century technologies, especially military aviation, naval aviation, jet aircraft, and guided missiles, reduced the primacy of cannons, battleships, and coastal artillery. In countries where coastal artillery has not been disbanded, these forces have acquired amphibious capabilities. In littoral warfare, mobile coastal artillery armed with surface-to-surface missiles can still be used to deny the use of sea lanes.
 
It was long held as a rule of thumb that one shore-based gun equaled three naval guns of the same caliber, due to the steadiness of the coastal gun which allowed for significantly higher accuracy than their sea-mounted counterparts. Land-based guns also benefited in most cases from the additional protection of walls or earth mounds.  The range of gunpowder-based coastal artillery also has a derivative role in international law and diplomacy, wherein a country's three mile limit of "coastal waters" is recognized as under the nation or state's laws.

History 

One of the first recorded uses of coastal artillery was in 1381—during the war between Ferdinand I of Portugal and Henry II of Castile—when the troops of the King of Portugal used cannons to defend Lisbon against an attack from the Castilian naval fleet.

The use of coastal artillery expanded during the Age of Discoveries, in the 16th century; when a colonial power took over an overseas territory, one of their first tasks was to build a coastal fortress, both to deter rival naval powers and to subjugate the natives. The Martello tower is an excellent example of a widely used coastal fort which mounted defensive artillery, in this case muzzle-loading cannon. During the 19th century China also built hundreds of coastal fortresses in an attempt to counter Western naval threats.

Coastal artillery fortifications generally followed the development of land fortifications; sometimes separate land defence forts were built to protect coastal forts. Through the middle 19th century, coastal forts could be bastion forts, star forts, polygonal forts, or sea forts, the first three types often with detached gun batteries called "water batteries". Coastal defence weapons throughout history were heavy naval guns or weapons based on them, often supplemented by lighter weapons. In the late 19th century separate batteries of coastal artillery replaced forts in some countries; in some areas these became widely separated geographically through the mid-20th century as weapon ranges increased. The amount of landward defence provided began to vary by country from the late 19th century; by 1900 new US forts almost totally neglected these defences. Booms were also usually part of a protected harbor's defences. In the middle 19th century underwater minefields and later controlled mines were often used, or stored in peacetime to be available in wartime. With the rise of the submarine threat at the beginning of the 20th century, anti-submarine nets were used extensively, usually added to boom defences, with major warships often being equipped with them (to allow rapid deployment once the ship was anchored or moored) through early World War I. In World War I railway artillery emerged and soon became part of coastal artillery in some countries; with railway artillery in coast defence some type of revolving mount had to be provided to allow tracking of fast-moving targets.

Coastal artillery could be part of the Navy (as in Scandinavian countries, war-time Germany, and the Soviet Union), or part of the Army (as in English-speaking countries). In English-speaking countries, certain coastal artillery positions were sometimes referred to as 'Land Batteries', distinguishing this form of artillery battery from for example floating batteries.
In the United Kingdom, in the later 19th and earlier 20th Centuries, the land batteries of the coastal artillery were the responsibility of the Royal Garrison Artillery.

In the United States, coastal artillery was established in 1794 as a branch of the Army and a series of construction programs of coastal defenses began: the "First System" in 1794, the "Second System" in 1804, and the "Third System" or "Permanent System" in 1816. Masonry forts were determined to be obsolete following the American Civil War, and a postwar program of earthwork defenses was poorly funded. In 1885 the Endicott Board recommended an extensive program of new U.S. harbor defenses, featuring new rifled artillery and minefield defenses; most of the board's recommendations were implemented. Construction on these was initially slow, as new weapons and systems were developed from scratch, but was greatly hastened following the Spanish–American War of 1898. Shortly thereafter, in 1907, Congress split the field artillery and coast artillery into separate branches, creating a separate Coast Artillery Corps (CAC) The CAC was disbanded as a separate branch in 1950.

In the first decade of the 20th century, the United States Marine Corps established the Advanced Base Force. The force was used for setting up and defending advanced overseas bases, and its close ties to the Navy allowed it to man coast artillery around these bases.

Russo-Japanese War

During the Siege of Port Arthur, Japanese forces had captured the vantage point on 203 Meter Hill overlooking Port Arthur harbor. After relocating heavy  howitzers with 500 pound (~220 kg) armor-piercing shells to the summit of the Hill, the Japanese bombarded the Russian fleet in the harbor, systematically sinking the Russian ships within range. The Japanese were attacking the city and the Russian ships were trapped in the harbor due to mines, making this one of the few cases of coastal guns being employed in an offensive action.

On December 5, 1904, the battleship Poltava was destroyed, followed by the battleship Retvizan on December 7, 1904, the battleships Pobeda and Peresvet and the cruisers Pallada and Bayan on December 9, 1904. The battleship Sevastopol, although hit 5 times by  shells, managed to move out of range of the guns. Stung by the fact that the Russian Pacific Fleet had been sunk by the army and not by the Imperial Japanese Navy, and with a direct order from Tokyo that the Sevastopol was not to be allowed to escape, Admiral Togo sent in wave after wave of destroyers in six separate attacks on the sole remaining Russian battleship. After 3 weeks, the Sevastopol was still afloat, having survived 124 torpedoes fired at her while sinking two Japanese destroyers and damaging six other vessels. The Japanese had meanwhile lost the cruiser Takasago to a mine outside the harbor.

World War II

Norway

During the Battle of Drøbak Sound in April 1940, the German navy lost the new heavy cruiser Blücher, one of their most modern ships, to a combination of fire from various coastal artillery emplacements, including two obsolete German-made Krupp 280 mm (11 in) guns and equally obsolete Whitehead torpedoes. The Blücher had entered the narrow waters of the Oslofjord, carrying 1,000 soldiers and leading a German invasion fleet. The first salvo from the Norwegian defenders, fired from Oscarsborg Fortress about 1 mile (1,600 meters) distant, disabled Blücher's main battery and set her afire.

Fire from the smaller guns (57 mm to 150 mm) swept her decks and disabled her steering, and she received several torpedo hits before the fires reached her magazines and doomed her. As a result, the remainder of the invasion fleet reversed, the Norwegian royal family, parliament and cabinet escaped, and the Norwegian gold reserves were safely removed from the city before it fell.

Singapore
Singapore was defended by its famous large-caliber coastal guns, which included one battery of three  guns and one with two  guns. Prime Minister Winston Churchill nicknamed the garrison as "The Gibraltar of the East" and the "Lion of the Sea". This perhaps compelled the Japanese to launch their invasion of Singapore from the north, via Malaya, in December 1941.

It is a commonly repeated misconception that Singapore's large-calibre coastal guns were ineffective against the Japanese because they were designed to face south to defend the harbour against naval attack and could not be turned round to face north. In fact, most of the guns could be turned, and were indeed fired at the invaders. However, the guns were supplied mostly with armour-piercing (AP) shells and few high explosive (HE) shells. AP shells were designed to penetrate the hulls of heavily armoured warships and were mostly ineffective against infantry targets. Military analysts later estimated that if the guns had been well supplied with HE shells the Japanese attackers would have suffered heavy casualties, but the invasion would not have been prevented by this means alone. The guns of Singapore achieved their purpose in deterring a Japanese naval attack as the possibility of an expensive capital ship being sunk made it inadvisable for the Japanese to attack Singapore via the sea. The very fact that the Japanese chose to advance down from Thailand through Malaya to take Singapore was a testament for the respect the Japanese had for the coastal artillery at Singapore. However, the lack of HE shells rendered Singapore vulnerable to a land based attack from Malaya via the Johore straits.

Pacific
In December 1941, during the Battle of Wake Island, US Marine defense battalions fired at the Japanese invasion fleet with six 5-inch (127 mm) guns, sinking the Japanese destroyer Hayate by scoring direct hits on her magazines, and scoring eleven hits on the light cruiser Yubari, forcing her to withdraw, and temporarily repulsing Japanese efforts to take the island.

The Harbor Defenses of Manila and Subic Bays denied Manila harbor to the invading Japanese until Corregidor fell to amphibious assault on 6 May 1942, nearly a month after the fall of Bataan.  Beyond tying up besieging Japanese forces (who suffered severe supply shortages due to the inability to use Manila as a port), the forts allowed interception of radio traffic later decisive at Midway.

The Japanese defended the island of Betio in the Tarawa atoll with numerous 203 mm (8-inch) coastal guns. In 1943, these were knocked out early in the battle with a combined USN naval and aerial bombardment.

Atlantic Wall

Nazi Germany fortified its conquered territories with the Atlantic Wall. Organization Todt built a string of reinforced concrete pillboxes and bunkers along the beaches, or sometimes slightly inland, to house machine guns, antitank guns, and artillery ranging in size up to the large 40.6 cm naval guns. The intent was to destroy Allied landing craft before they could unload. During the Normandy Landings in 1944, shore bombardment was given a high importance, using ships from battleships to destroyers and landing craft. For example, the Canadians at Juno beach had fire support many times greater than they had had for the Dieppe Raid in 1942.

The old battleships HMS Ramillies and Warspite with the monitor HMS Roberts were used to suppress shore batteries east of the Orne; cruisers targeted shore batteries at Ver-sur-Mer and Moulineaux; while eleven destroyers provided local fire support.  The (equally old) battleship Texas was used to suppress the battery at Pointe du Hoc, but the guns there had been moved to an inland position, unbeknownst to the Allies. In addition, there were modified landing craft: eight "Landing Craft Gun", each with two 4.7-inch guns; four "Landing Craft Support" with automatic cannon; eight Landing Craft Tank (Rocket), each with a single salvo of 1,100 5-inch rockets; eight Landing Craft Assault (Hedgerow), each with twenty-four bombs intended to detonate beach mines prematurely. Twenty-four Landing Craft Tank carried Priest self-propelled 105mm howitzers which also fired while they were on the run-in to the beach. Similar arrangements existed at other beaches.

On June 25, 1944 the American battleship Texas engaged German shore batteries on the Cotentin Peninsula around Cherbourg. Battery Hamburg straddled the ship with a salvo of 240mm shells, eventually hitting Texas twice; one shell damaging the conning tower and navigation bridge, with the other penetrating below decks but failing to explode. Return fire from Texas knocked out the German battery.

Allied efforts to take the port of Toulon in August 1944 ran into "Big Willie", a battery consisting of two prewar French turrets, equipped with the guns taken from the French battleship Provence, each mounting a pair of 340 mm naval guns. The range and power of these guns was such that the Allies dedicated a battleship or heavy cruiser to shelling the fort every day, with the battleship Nevada eventually silencing the guns on August 23, 1944.

Post-World War II
After World War II the advent of jet aircraft and guided missiles reduced the role of coastal artillery in defending a country against air and sea attacks while also rendering fixed artillery emplacements vulnerable to enemy strikes.

The Scandinavian countries, with their long coastlines and relatively weak navies,  continued in the development and installation of modern coastal artillery systems, usually hidden in well-camouflaged armored turrets (for example Swedish 12 cm automatic turret gun). In these countries the coastal artillery was part of the naval forces and used naval targeting systems. Both mobile and stationary (e.g. 100 56 TK) systems were used.

In countries where coastal artillery has not been disbanded, these forces have acquired amphibious or anti-ship missile capabilities. In constricted waters, mobile coastal artillery armed with surface-to-surface missiles still can be used to deny the use of sea lanes. The Type 88 Surface-to-Ship Missile is an example of modern, mobile coastal artillery. Poland also retains a Coastal Missile Division armed with the Naval Strike Missile.

During the Croatian War of Independence in 1991, coastal artillery operated by Croatian forces played an important role in defending Croatian Adriatic coast from Yugoslav naval and air strikes, especially around Zadar, Šibenik and Split, defeating the Yugoslav Navy in the Battle of the Dalmatian Channels.

In practice, there is a distinction between artillery sited to bombard a coastal region and coastal artillery, which has naval-compatible targeting systems and communications that are integrated with the navy rather than the army.

Examples

In the UK
Admiralty Pier Turret
Tyne Turrets
Cross-Channel guns
Palmerston Forts
Needles Battery
Ness Battery

British coastal guns outside the UK
Castle Islands Fortifications, Fort St. Catherine's, St. David's Battery, Royal Naval Dockyard, Bermuda and nearly a hundred other forts and batteries built in Bermuda between 1612 and 1939.
Fort Siloso
Fort Ostenburg
Fort Queenscliff
Hobart coastal defences
Coastal fortifications of New Zealand

United States of America
Board of Fortifications
U.S. Army Coast Artillery Corps
Seacoast defense in the United States
List of coastal fortifications of the United States
Battery Chamberlin

Canada
York Redoubt
Connaught Battery
Cape Spear
Fort Amherst

Asia
Manila and Subic Bays
Fort Drum (El Fraile Island)
Fort Mills
Singapore - consisted of five 15-inch (381 mm) guns

Nazi Germany
Atlantic Wall
Hanstholm fortress / Batterie Vara
Cross-Channel guns
Battery Lothringen

South & Central America
Callao
Fort Copacabana
Santa Clara Battery
Valdivian fort system

Australia
Fort Denison
Fort Glanville
Fort Pearce

Other
 Coastal artillery of the Dardanelles Strait, Ottoman Empire
 German coastal battery Tirpitz near Constanța, Romania
 Swedish Coastal Artillery
 Russian Empire: Peter the Great's Naval Fortress, part of the fortification line protecting Saint Petersburg
 Spanish Army Coastal Artillery, including eighteen 38.1 cm /45 Model 1926 naval gun

Gallery

See also

 Artillery
 List of coastal artillery
 Coastal defence and fortification
 Seacoast defense in the United States
 Gun laying
 Disappearing gun
 Anti-ship ballistic missile

Books and articles

References

External links

Coast Defense Study Group homepage and list of US forts and batteries
A brief history of the coast artillery corps
Defenses along the Pacific Coast of the United States
Fort Carroll
Coastal Artillery of Finland and Russia at Northern Fortress
John T. Duchesneau: The Artillery of Fort Adams

 
 

 
Fortification weapons
Coastal fortifications